Roland Mikler (born 20 September 1984) is a Hungarian handball player for SC Pick Szeged and the Hungarian national team.

Honours

National team
Junior World Championship:
 : 2005

Club
Dunaferr SE
Nemzeti Bajnokság I
 : 2002, 2003, 2004, 2005, 2006, 2007, 2008, 2009
Magyar Kupa
: 2007
: 2002, 2005, 2008

Pick Szeged
EHF Cup
 : 2014
Nemzeti Bajnokság I
 : 2021, 2022
 : 2011, 2012, 2013, 2014
Magyar Kupa
 : 2012, 2013, 2014, 2021
 : 2022

Telekom Veszprém
EHF Champions League
 : 2015, 2016, 2019
 : 2017
SEHA League
 : 2015, 2016
 : 2017
Nemzeti Bajnokság I
 : 2015, 2016, 2017, 2019
 : 2018
Magyar Kupa
 : 2015, 2016, 2017, 2018
 : 2019

Individual
All-Star Goalkeeper of the Junior World Championship: 2005
Hungarian Goalkeeper of the Year: 2011, 2013, 2014, 2015, 2016, 2017, 2019
Hungarian Handballer of the Year: 2014
All-Star Goalkeeper of the EHF Champions League: 2015

References

External links

Roland Mikler player profile on SC Pick Szeged official website
Roland Mikler career statistics on Worldhandball.com

1984 births
Living people
Hungarian male handball players
Sportspeople from Dunaújváros
Handball players at the 2012 Summer Olympics
Olympic handball players of Hungary
Veszprém KC players
SC Pick Szeged players